The Sussex-Wantage Regional School District is a comprehensive regional public school district that serves students in kindergarten through eighth grade from Sussex Borough and Wantage Township, two municipalities in northern Sussex County, New Jersey, United States.

As of the 2019–20 school year, the district, comprised of three schools, had an enrollment of 1,049 students and 99.0 classroom teachers (on an FTE basis), for a student–teacher ratio of 10.6:1.

The district is classified by the New Jersey Department of Education as being in District Factor Group "FG", the fourth-highest of eight groupings. District Factor Groups organize districts statewide to allow comparison by common socioeconomic characteristics of the local districts. From lowest socioeconomic status to highest, the categories are A, B, CD, DE, FG, GH, I and J.

For ninth through twelfth grades, public school students from both Sussex and Wantage attend High Point Regional High School, together with students from Branchville, Frankford Township, Lafayette Township and Montague Township. As of the 2019–20 school year, the high school had an enrollment of 866 students and 76.9 classroom teachers (on an FTE basis), for a student–teacher ratio of 11.3:1.

History
With the opening of High Point Regional High School in September 1966, Sussex High School was closed, which had served students from both Sussex and Wantage. With the closure of the high school, the building was repurposed as Sussex Middle School.

Schools 
Schools in the district (with 2019–20 enrollment data from the National Center for Education Statistics) are:
Clifton E. Lawrence School in Wantage, with 376 students in grades K - 2
Michael Gall, Principal
Wantage Elementary School in Wantage, with 340 students in grades 3 - 5
Christopher Gregory, Principal
Sussex Middle School in Sussex, with 328 students in grades 6 - 8
Shane Schwarz, Principal
Kaleigh Themelakis, Vice Principal

Administration 
Core members of the district's administration are:
Michael Gall, Superintendent
Christina M. Riker, Business Administrator / Board Secretary

Board of education
The district's board of education, comprised of nine members, sets policy and oversees the fiscal and educational operation of the district through its administration. As a Type II school district, the board's trustees are elected directly by voters to serve three-year terms of office on a staggered basis, with three seats up for election each year held (since 2012) as part of the November general election. The board appoints a superintendent to oversee the day-to-day operation of the district. Seats on the board are allocated based on the population of the constituent municipalities, with seven seats assigned to Wantage Township and two to Sussex.

References

External links 
Sussex-Wantage Regional School District

School Data for the Sussex-Wantage Regional School District, National Center for Education Statistics

Sussex, New Jersey
Wantage Township, New Jersey
New Jersey District Factor Group FG
School districts in Sussex County, New Jersey